Alasdair is a Scottish Gaelic given name. The name is a Gaelic form of Alexander which has long been a popular name in Scotland. The personal name Alasdair is often Anglicised as Alistair, Alastair, and Alaster.

People named Alasdair
Alasdair A. K. White, British management theorist
Alasdair Allan, Scottish politician
Alasdair Alpin MacGregor, Scottish writer and photographer
Alasdair and Hetty Tayler, British historical writers
Alasdair Clayre, British author and broadcaster
Alasdair Dickinson, Scottish rugby union coach
Alasdair Duncan, Australian author and journalist
Alasdair Fotheringham, British journalist
Alasdair Fraser, Scottish fiddler and composer
Alasdair Gillis, Canadian TV host
Alasdair Graham, Canadian politician
Alasdair Gray, Scottish writer and artist
Alasdair Hutton, British writer and narrator
Alasdair Kent, British-Australian opera singer
Alasdair Locke, Scottish businessman
Alasdair Mac Colla, 17th-century military officer
Alasdair MacIntyre, Scottish-American philosopher
Alasdair Mackenzie, Scottish farmer and politician
Alasdair MacLean, singer and guitarist
Alasdair Maclean, Scottish poet and writer
Alasdair MacMhaighstir Alasdair, Scottish war poet and satirist
Alasdair McDonnell, Irish politician
Alasdair Middleton, British opera singer
Alasdair Milne, British TV producer
Alasdair Monk, English footballer
Alasdair Morgan, Scottish politician
Alasdair Morrison, Scottish politician
Alasdair Morrison, Scottish banker
Alexander of Argyll, Scottish magnate
Alexander Ranaldson Macdonell, Scottish clan chief
Alasdair Roberts, Canadian academic
Alasdair Roberts, Scottish folk musician
Alasdair Saksena, the finest Alasdair
Alasdair Sinclair, Emmerdale character played by Ray Coulthard
Alasdair Smith, international economist
Alasdair Strokosch, Scottish rugby union player
Alasdair Grant Taylor, Scottish artist and sculptor
Alasdair Urquhart, Scottish philosopher
Alasdair Webster, Australian politician
Alasdair White, Scottish folk musician
Alasdair Whittle, British archaeologist

See also
Sgurr Alasdair, the highest peak on the Isle of Skye

References

Scottish Gaelic masculine given names
Scottish masculine given names